Dehnow (also Romanized as Deh-e Now and Deh Nau; also known as Deh Sālār) is a village in Dehsard Rural District, in the Central District of Arzuiyeh County, Kerman Province, Iran. At the 2006 census, its population was 75, in 23 families.

References 

Populated places in Arzuiyeh County